Tostes is a former commune in the Eure department in Normandy in north-western France. On 1 January 2017, it was merged into the new commune Terres de Bord.

Population

Personalities

Notable People
Joseph Lion: published a study in the Almanac Normand-Percheron in 1908 on the use of potash fertilizer in Normandy

Fictional Characters
Madame Bovary
Tostes is often accredited as the location of Charles and Emma Bovary's first home in Gustave Flaubert's novel; in actuality, it is the commune of Tôtes (postal code 76890) in the department of Seine-Maritime (previously Seine-Inférieure) that inspired the novelist. The confusion stems from the fact that in the 19th century the names of both locales were indiscriminately spelled as Tostes, Tôtes, or Totes. This information can be found in several sources, including the website of the University of Rouen, which has devoted much of  the past two decades to numerous research studies on the genesis of Madame Bovary.  On this map, the proximity of Totes to Yvetot leaves no doubt as to the location of the village where Charles Bovary was established as a health officer.

See also
Communes of the Eure department

References

Former communes of Eure